The 2014 Budapest Assembly election was held on 12 October 2014, concurring with other local elections in Hungary. Voters elected the Mayor of Budapest, and the mayors of the 23 districts directly, while 9 seats in the assembly were distributed proportionally, taking into account votes cast for losing district mayoral candidates. This was the first election held under these rules, previously all seats (except for the Mayor) were elected with a party-list method.

Mayor 

Incumbent Mayor István Tarlós was reelected with 49.06% of the votes.

District mayors

Distribution of compensation seats 

Compensation seats were distributed using the D'Hondt method.

Notes

References 

2014 in Hungary
2014 elections in Europe
Local elections in Hungary
History of Budapest